Maurice Sumray (1920-2004) was an English artist and engraver, based in St Ives, Cornwall. Sumray was described by Wyndham Lewis in The Listener as one of the "best artists in England".

Major retrospective exhibitions of his work were displayed at the Penwith Gallery, St Ives in 1984, and the Falmouth Art Gallery in 1997,

References

1920 births
2004 deaths
20th-century English painters
English male painters
21st-century English painters
St Ives artists
Painters from London
20th-century English male artists
21st-century English male artists